Patriarch Arsenije may refer to:

 Patriarch Arsenije II, Archbishop of Peć and Serbian Patriarch from 1457 to 1463
 Patriarch Arsenije III, Archbishop of Peć and Serbian Patriarch from 1674 to 1690 (1706)
 Patriarch Arsenije IV, Archbishop of Peć and Serbian Patriarch from 1725 to 1737 (1748)

See also
Arsenije (name)
Archbishop Arsenije (disambiguation)
Patriarch Gavrilo (disambiguation)
List of heads of the Serbian Orthodox Church